Yegoryevsk is a town and the administrative center of Yegoryevsk Urban Settlement in Moscow Oblast, Russia, located on the right bank of the Guslitsa River  southeast of Moscow.

Toponymy
Yegoryevsk was named honor of St. Egory, that is, Saint George.

History
It has been known since 1462 as the village of Vysokoye. Town status was granted to it in 1778. The new town was quite small with a population of only 280 males and 295 females, mostly merchants and burgesses.

Yegoryevsk was famous for its annual fairs, where bread was mainly sold. In the 19th century, Yegoryevsk became the center of the textile industry. The Khludov brothers cotton factory has been in operation since 1845. It has survived to this day and its watches are one of the main sights of the town. Yegoryevsk also owed its development to the mayor from 1872 to 1901, . At his order, the Moscow architect  built the Egoryevsk Mechanical and Electrical Engineering School named after Tsarevich Alexei, and the Holy Trinity Mariinsky Convent was rebuilt.

Yegoryevsk is also an important center of Old Believers.

Administrative and municipal status
Within the framework of administrative divisions, Yegoryevsk serves as the administrative center of Yegoryevsky District. As an administrative division, it is, together with sixty-two rural localities, incorporated within Yegoryevsky District as the Town of Yegoryevsk. As a municipal division, the Town of Yegoryevsk is incorporated within Yegoryevsky Municipal District as Yegoryevsk Urban Settlement.

Culture
The town is home to many historic buildings from the 18th and 19th centuries, as well as a museum with both art and artifacts of daily life in earlier centuries.

Military
Yegoryevsk was home to the 924th Center of Combat Application for UAVs, prior to the center being reincorporated in Kolomna as the 1327th UAV Combat Training Center in 2009.

Notable people

 Aliya Mustafina (born 1994), retired Olympic gymnast, born and raised in Yegoryevsk.
 Vadim Romanov (born 1978), Russian professional football coach, former player

Twin towns and sister cities

Yegoryevsk is twinned with:
 Pirdop, Bulgaria
 Mazyr, Belarus
 Zhuji, China
 Zghurivka, Ukraine

References

Notes

Sources

External links
Unofficial website of Yegoryevsk 

Cities and towns in Moscow Oblast
Yegoryevsky Uyezd